Mindanao State University – Sulu (commonly referred to as MSU Sulu) is a public coeducational institution of higher education and research located in the municipality of Jolo, Sulu, Philippines. It was founded in 1974 by Mindanao State University Board of Regents through Resolution No. 860, Series of 1974.

History
Mindanao State University (MSU) Sulu is formerly known as MSU-Sulu Development and Technical College (SDTC). The campus was a founded by the government to rehabilitate the educational situation of the province of Sulu in 1974.

When it began, the school had temporarily held classes at the grandstand of the Elementary School with its office and at resident of then Commission on Election (COMELEC) Commissioner Hashim R. Abubakar. Out of necessity, founding Director Exuan T. Dagbusan appealed and asked the intercession of the provincial officials and subsequently, the Sulu Provincial Board passed Resolution No. 64, Series 1974 donating 11.5 hectares lot for the decent occupancy of MSU-SDTC. The present campus site is about 1.3 kilometers from Jolo town proper.

Academic units
Currently, the university has nine academic units.
 
Graduate School
College of Agriculture
College of Arts and Sciences
College of Business Administration
College of Computer Studies
College of Education
College of Fisheries
College of Public Affairs
Senior High School
Laboratory High School

References

External links 
 MSU - Main Campus official website 
 MSU - Iligan Institute of Technology official website
 MSU - General Santos City official website
 MSU - Naawan Campus official website
 MSU- Buug Campus official website
Mindanao State University College of Medicine

State universities and colleges in the Philippines
Mindanao Association State Colleges and Universities Foundation
Philippine Association of State Universities and Colleges
Research universities in the Philippines
 
Universities and colleges in Sulu
1961 establishments in the Philippines
Educational institutions established in 1961